Thomas Shaftesbury Smith (c. 1893 – c. 1965) was a rugby union player who represented Australia.

Smith, a prop, claimed a total of 12 international rugby caps for Australia.

References

                   

Australian rugby union players
Australia international rugby union players
Year of birth uncertain
Rugby union props